David "Sammy" Yates (born 18 March 1953) is an English former professional footballer who played as a full-back.

References

1953 births
Living people
Footballers from Barnsley
English footballers
Association football fullbacks
Barnsley F.C. players
Grimsby Town F.C. players
Frickley Athletic F.C. players
Matlock Town F.C. players
English Football League players